Olešná is a municipality and village in Beroun District in the Central Bohemian Region of the Czech Republic. It has about 400 inhabitants. The centre of Olešná with well preserved folk architecture is protected as a village monument zone.

References

Villages in the Beroun District